Gertrude Berg (Born Tillie Edelstein; October 3, 1899 – September 14, 1966) was an American actress, screenwriter, and producer. A pioneer of classic radio, she was one of the first women to create, write, produce, and star in a long-running hit when she premiered her serial comedy-drama The Rise of the Goldbergs (1929), later known as The Goldbergs. Her career achievements included winning a Tony Award and an Emmy Award, both for Best Lead Actress.

Life and career
Berg was born Tillie Edelstein in 1899 in the East Harlem neighborhood of Manhattan, New York City, to Jacob and Dinah Edelstein, natives of Russia and England, respectively. Berg's chronically unstable mother Dinah, grieving over the death of her young son, experienced a series of nervous breakdowns and later died in a sanitarium.

Tillie, who lived with her family on Lexington Avenue, married Lewis Berg in 1918; they had two children, Cherney (1922–2003) and Harriet (1926–2003). She learned theater while producing skits at her father's Catskills Mountains resort in Fleischmanns, New York.

After the sugar factory where her husband worked burned down, she developed a semi-autobiographical skit, portraying a Jewish family in a Bronx tenement, into a radio show. Though the household had a typewriter, Berg wrote her script by hand, taking the pages this way to a long-awaited appointment at NBC.  When the executive she was meeting with protested that he could not read what Berg had written, she read the script aloud to him. Her performance not only sold the idea for the radio program but also got Berg the job as the lead actress on the program she had written. Berg continued to write the show's scripts by hand in pencil for as long as the program was on the air.

On November 20, 1929, a 15-minute episode of The Rise of the Goldbergs was first broadcast on the NBC radio network.  She started at US$75 a week.  Less than two years later, in the heart of the Great Depression, she let the sponsor propose a salary and was told, "Mrs. Berg, we can't pay a cent over $2,000 a week." Berg's husband, Lewis—who became a successful consulting engineer, though his job loss prompted her to write the initial radio script—refused to be photographed with his wife for publicity purposes, as he felt this was infringing on her success.

Berg became inextricably identified as Molly Goldberg, the big-hearted matriarch of her fictional Bronx family who moved to Connecticut as a symbol of upward mobility of American Jews. She wrote nearly all the show's radio episodes (more than 5,000) plus a Broadway adaptation, Me and Molly (1948). It took considerable convincing, but Berg finally prevailed upon CBS to let her bring The Goldbergs to television in 1949. Early episodes portrayed the Goldberg family openly and personally struggling to adapt to American life. Just as Berg stated in her autobiography, she chose to depict her Jewish grandfather's worship in her first radio broadcast show. Her characters Molly, Jake, Sammy and Rosie emphasized her day-to-day stories of Jewish immigration to America.

Immigrant life and the Goldberg family struggle were familiar and relatable to many families during this point in American history. Radio seemed to produce a common place to tie patriotism and families together. The program's success was largely because of the familiar feelings of the American people portrayed in the program's scripts. The first season script was later published in book form.

In 1951, Berg won the first ever Emmy Award for Lead Actress in a Television Series in her twentieth year of playing the role. The show would stay in production for five more years.

The Goldbergs ran into trouble in 1951, during the McCarthy Era. Co-star Philip Loeb (Molly's husband, patriarch Jake Goldberg) was one of the performers named in Red Channels: The Report of Communist Influence in Radio and Television and blacklisted as a result. The series was canceled as a result of Loeb's participation, and both network and sponsors insisted Loeb be fired as a condition of the show returning to air, despite Berg's protests. Loeb resigned rather than cause Berg trouble. He reportedly received a generous severance package from the show, but it did not prevent him from sinking into a depression that ultimately drove him to suicide in 1955. The Goldbergs returned a year after Loeb departed the show and continued until 1954, after which Berg also wrote and produced a syndicated film version. The show remained in syndicated reruns for another few years, after one year of production and 39 episodes (it aired on some stations as Molly). The series is currently seen on the Jewish Life Television (JLTV) cable network.

Berg continued to make guest appearances on television in the 1950s and early 1960s. She appeared on The Pat Boone Chevy Showroom, a February 1958 episode of The Ford Show, Starring Tennessee Ernie Ford,  and was the "mystery guest'" on the series What's My Line? in 1954, 1960, and 1961. In 1961, Berg made a last stab at television success in the Four Star Television situation comedy, Mrs. G. Goes to College (retitled The Gertrude Berg Show at midseason), playing a 62-year-old widow who enrolls in college. The series was cancelled after one season.

Berg continued working in theatre through these years. In 1959, she won the Tony Award for Best Actress for her performance in A Majority of One. In 1961, Berg won the Sarah Siddons Award for her work in Chicago theater. Berg also published a best-selling memoir, Molly and Me, in 1961.

Death and legacy
Berg died of heart failure on September 14, 1966, aged 66, at Doctors Hospital in Manhattan. She is buried at Clovesville Cemetery in Fleischmanns, New York.

A biography of Berg, Something on My Own: Gertrude Berg and American Broadcasting, 1929–1956, by Glenn D. Smith, Jr. (Syracuse University Press) appeared in 2007. Aviva Kempner's 2009 documentary, Yoo-Hoo, Mrs. Goldberg, deals with Berg's career, and to an extent, her personal life.

References

Further reading
 

 "Tuning in to Women in Television" (National Women's History Museum)

External links

Gertrude Berg Honoree at The Paley Center for Media
Syracuse University: Gertrude Berg Papers
Interview with Fred Rogers Gertrude Berg on the PBS show Children's Corner, Archive of American Television interview with Fred Rogers, part 4 of 9, about ten minutes into the program.
Webcast on Gertrude Berg, The Paley Center for Media, "From The Goldbergs to 2005: The Evolution of the Family Sitcom" (November 16, 2005)

1899 births
1966 deaths
American people of Russian-Jewish descent
Actresses from New York City
American women screenwriters
American film actresses
American radio personalities
Screenwriters from New York (state)
American television actresses
Television producers from New York City
American women television producers
Outstanding Performance by a Lead Actress in a Comedy Series Primetime Emmy Award winners
Tony Award winners
Jewish American comedians
Jewish women writers
Jewish American actresses
People from East Harlem
20th-century American actresses
Washington Irving High School (New York City) alumni
Jewish American screenwriters
20th-century American women writers
20th-century American screenwriters
20th-century American Jews